Won-il is a Korean masculine given name. Its meaning differs based on the hanja used to write each syllable of the name. There are 35 hanja with the reading "won" and ten hanja with the reading "il" on the South Korean government's official list of hanja which may be used in given names.

Hanja
Some ways in which this name may be written in hanja include:
 (으뜸 원, 한 일), with hanja meaning "best"/"basis" and "one". These hanja may also correspond to the Japanese names Gen'ichi, Motoichi, and Motokazu.
 (근원 원, 한 일), with hanja meaning "origin" and "one". These hanja may also correspond to the Japanese names Gen'ichi, Motoichi, and Motokazu.
 (둥글 원, 한 일), with hanja meaning "round" and "one".

People
People with this name include:
Sohn Won-yil (1909–1980), South Korean navy vice admiral
Kim Won-il (born 1942), South Korean writer
Rhee Won-il (1960–2011), South Korean digital art curator
Son Won-il (voice actor) (born 1962), South Korean voice actor
Lee Won-il (born 1979), South Korean chef
Kim Won-il (boxer) (born 1982), South Korean boxer
Yoon Won-il (born 1983), South Korean footballer (K League 1)
Kim Won-il (footballer) (born 1986), South Korean footballer (K League 1)
Yoon Won-il (born 1986), South Korean footballer (K League Challenge)

See also
List of Korean given names

References

Korean masculine given names